Roger Mangin (born 13 December 1947) is a French former sports shooter. He competed in the skeet event at the 1972 Summer Olympics.

References

1947 births
Living people
French male sport shooters
Olympic shooters of France
Shooters at the 1972 Summer Olympics
Place of birth missing (living people)